Pseudanisentomon is a genus of proturans in the family Eosentomidae. It was described by Zhang and Yin in 1984.

Species
 Pseudanisentomon babai (Imadaté, 1964)
 Pseudanisentomon cangshanense Imadaté, Yin & Xie, 1995
 Pseudanisentomon dolichempodium (Yin & Zhang, 1982)
 Pseudanisentomon guangxinicum (Yin & Zhang, 1982)
 Pseudanisentomon huichouense Zhang & Yin, 1984
 Pseudanisentomon ishii Nakamura, 1996
 Pseudanisentomon jiangxiensis Yin, 1987
 Pseudanisentomon meihwa (Yin, 1965)
 Pseudanisentomon minystigmum (Yin, 1979)
 Pseudanisentomon molykos Zhang & Yin, 1984
 Pseudanisentomon paurophthalmum Zhang & Yin, 1984
 Pseudanisentomon pedanempodium (Zhang & Yin, 1981)
 Pseudanisentomon sheshanensis (Yin, 1965)
 Pseudanisentomon sininotiale Zhang & Yin, 1984
 Pseudanisentomon songkiangense Yin, 1977
 Pseudanisentomon trilinum (Zhang & Yin, 1981)
 Pseudanisentomon wanense Zhang, 1987
 Pseudanisentomon yaoshanense Zhang & Yin, 1984
 Pseudanisentomon yongxingense Yin, 1988

References

Protura